A by-election was held for the New South Wales Legislative Assembly electorate of Cobar on 23 September 1911 because Donald Macdonell was absent for a full session of parliament.

Macdonell had been absent because he was unwell but he was expected to recover.

The members for Mudgee, Bill Dunn, and Liverpool Plains, Henry Hoyle, resigned from the Labour Party and Parliament on 25 July 1911 in protest at legislation on land ownership introduced by Secretary for Lands, Niels Nielson. As a result, Labour was left without a majority in the house and rather than face a vote of no confidence, the Ministry and Speaker resigned. This forced the House to be prorogued with the result that Macdonell was automatically expelled for non-attendance during an entire session. By the time of the subsequent by-elections, Labour policy had been reversed and Nielsen had left the ministry. Dunn rejoined the party and successfully re-contested the Mudgee by-election on 16 August 1911. Hoyle did not re-contest the Liverpool Plains by-election on 16 August 1911 which was won by Liberal candidate, John Perry by three votes on the same day. This result was overturned on appeal and at the second by-election on 28 October William Ashford (Labour) was successful.

Dates

Result

The by-election was required because Donald Macdonell had been absent for a full session of parliament.

Aftermath
Donald Macdonell died three weeks later and Charles Fern (politician) (Labour) was unopposed at the December by-election.

See also
Electoral results for the district of Cobar
List of New South Wales state by-elections

References

1911 elections in Australia
New South Wales state by-elections
1910s in New South Wales